Marin Street station (also signed as Islais Creek) is a light rail station on the Muni Metro T Third Street line, located in the median of 3rd Street one block south of Cesar Chavez Street in the Bayview neighborhood of San Francisco, California. The station opened with the T Third Street line on April 7, 2007. It has two side platforms; the northbound platform is south of South Street, and the southbound platform north of Marin Street.

References

External links 

SFMTA: Third Street & Marin St northbound, southbound
SF Bay Transit (unofficial): Third Street & Marin St

Muni Metro stations
Railway stations in the United States opened in 2007